Victorio Unamuno Ibarzabal (21 May 1909 – 20 May 1988), also known as Unamuno I, was a Spanish footballer who played as a forward.

He amassed La Liga totals of 144 games and 101 goals, with Athletic Bilbao and Betis.

Career
Unamuno was born in Bergara, Gipuzkoa. After helping Deportivo Alavés to the semi-finals of the 1928 Copa del Rey he was signed by neighbouring Athletic Bilbao to be part of their team in the newly-formed national league. He went on win two La Liga titles and four consecutive domestic cups, notably forming an attacking partnership with Bata, Guillermo Gorostiza, José Iraragorri, Chirri II and Lafuente.

In the summer of 1933, Unamuno joined Real Betis. In the 1934–35 season he scored a team-best 13 goals, and the club won its first and only national championship.

After leaving Seville, Unamuno's career was interrupted by the Spanish Civil War, and he subsequently returned to Athletic. In the 1939–40 campaign he netted 20 times – and Gorostiza added 16 – en route to being crowned the competition's Pichichi, helping the side to third place; he retired in 1942, aged 33.

Personal life
Unamuno's younger brother, Vicente (1917–1988, known as Unamuno II), was also a footballer and a forward. The siblings were teammates at Athletic Bilbao during 1939–40 even though the latter did not appear in the league, but the pair did help the club win the Biscay Championship in that year; the former died in Durango, Biscay, one day before his 79th birthday.

Honours
Athletic Bilbao
La Liga: 1929–30, 1930–31
Copa del Rey: 1930, 1931, 1932, 1933
Biscay Championship: 1928–29, 1930–31, 1931–32, 1932–33, 1939–40Betis La Liga: 1934–35 Individual'''
Pichichi Trophy: 1939–40

References

External links

1909 births
1988 deaths
People from Bergara
Spanish footballers
Footballers from the Basque Country (autonomous community)
Association football forwards
La Liga players
Deportivo Alavés players
Athletic Bilbao footballers
Real Betis players
Pichichi Trophy winners
Sportspeople from Gipuzkoa